Canto Ostinato ("Obstinate Song" (as ostinato)) is a musical composition written by the Dutch composer Simeon ten Holt.

The piece was completed in 1976 and performed for the first time in 1979 and is by far his most popular and most performed work.

Performance 
The most remarkable aspect about this work is the amount of freedom that is given to the performer(s). The piece can be performed with different instruments and a different number of performers. Most commonly, it is played with either two or four pianos, but during the first performance in Bergen, North Holland in the Netherlands, the performers used three pianos and an electric organ. Other aspects that illustrate this freedom can be found in how this piece has been built up. The composer created a hundred and six small cells called 'sections' of a few bars, which can be played ad libitum and be repeated either one or many more times (some bridges excepted). Because of this build-up, performance may take from some two hours to more than a day.

The whole piece is at a steady tempo of ♩ = 60, marked so several times along the score. It starts with  that, given the fact that quintuplets are thoroughly used in this composition, is actually . Following is a complete representation of the structure of the work:

The piece is regularly performed live in the Netherlands with changing players and instruments, ranging from those with four pianos or one or more different instruments, to those played by a solo musician. A couple of performances have taken place with the carillon of the Dom Tower of Utrecht. It has also been performed in several public spaces all around the Netherlands, such as the Groningen railway station.

Style 
This piece is considered to be minimal in origin, because of the repetitive and obstinate nature of the piece, but there is some discussion on this subject. Ten Holt usually uses the term 'genetic code'  to describe his work, probably because of the typical build-up of the piece. As opposed to a high percentage of modern classical music that is not tonal and/or consonant, Canto Ostinato contains tonal harmonies and does not become (very) dissonant. Another typical aspect is the fact that one can hear the same or similar bass figures and harmonies throughout the piece, which explains the title. If one word would have to catch the essence of Canto Ostinato, one could use "meditative", as the different sections are similar, but generate different emotional reactions.

Examples of pieces written by Ten Holt in roughly the same way are Lemniscaat (1983), Horizon (1985), Incantatie IV, and Meandres (1997), none of which have become as popular as Canto Ostinato.

Recordings
Excerpts are available for download on official sites (see external links).

Many different recordings of Canto Ostinato are now available. The CD recording made by Kees Wieringa and Polo de Haas, published in 1996 by Emergo Classics, received Gold status, which means that more than 10,000 copies were sold (the actual number lies above 15,000). That is rather rare for modern classical-music performance CDs and especially for Dutch composers, who usually do not generate that much popularity. Another recording that is relatively popular is the four piano version of the Piano Ensemble, featuring Irene Russo, Fred Oldenburg, Sandra van Veen, and Jeroen van Veen and released by Brilliant Classics. One particular record was made by Ivo Janssen, released in 2009, which has a total length of around 60 minutes, and is a one-man, one-piano performance of the original composition. Simeon ten Holt was the official sponsor of the record of "Canto Ostinato" by the Dutch Rondane Quartet published in 2010.

Versions using other instruments than piano include solo organ (performed by Aart Bergwerff in 2007), solo harp (by Assia Cunego, Italy, in 2009), string quartet (by Matangi Quartet, 2020) and solo marimba (Peter Elbertse, 2012). Cunego's performance inspired Dutch pianist Ivo Janssen to record a one-man version for solo piano in 2009. Other versions use combinations of piano, organ, marimba, carillon, and other instruments.

Documentary 
Dutch documentary maker Ramón Gieling made the documentary "Over Canto" ("About Canto") about this piece. This documentary has been promoted in the Dutch TV-show De Wereld Draait Door.

References

External links 
 Listen to recordings on canto-ostinato.com or simeontenholt.com.
 The Grand Melody from Canto Ostinato by the Rondane Kwartet.
 Live recording of Canto Ostinato for 4 pianos. Eindhoven, 2 april 2011.
 The biography of Ten Holt
 

1976 compositions
20th-century classical music
Minimalistic compositions